The West Michigan League was an early 20th century minor league that included baseball teams in the western part of Michigan.  The league expanded and was then renamed the Michigan State League for the 1911 season.  Among the league's teams were the Traverse City Resorters, which folded after the 1914 season, the Cadillac Chiefs, Holland Wooden Shoes, and Muskegon Speed Boys.

Teams and Statistics (1910)

1910 West Michigan League standings
President: Thomas Jones
No Playoff Scheduled.

References

Queen City of the North, by Lawrence Wakefield

Baseball leagues in Michigan
Defunct minor baseball leagues in the United States